The following outline is provided as an overview of and topical guide to Tuvalu:

Tuvalu (formerly known as the Ellice Islands) – sovereign Polynesian island nation located in the South Pacific Ocean midway between Hawaii and Australia.  Its nearest neighbours are Kiribati, Samoa and Fiji. Comprising three reef islands and six true atolls with a gross land area of just 26 square kilometers (10 sq mi) it is the third-least populated independent country in the world, with only Vatican City and Nauru having fewer inhabitants.  It is also the second-smallest member by population of the United Nations. In terms of physical land size, Tuvalu is the fourth smallest country in the world, larger only than the Vatican City—0.44 km2; Monaco—1.95 km2 and Nauru—21 km2. Tuvalu's Exclusive Economic Zone (EEZ) covers an oceanic area of approximately 900,000 km2.

The first inhabitants of Tuvalu were Polynesians. Therefore, the origins of the people of Tuvalu are addressed in the theories regarding the spread of humans out of Southeast Asia, from Taiwan, via Melanesia and across the Pacific islands to create Polynesia.

Tuvalu was first sighted by Europeans on  16 January 1568 during the voyage of Álvaro de Mendaña de Neira from Spain who is understood to have sighted the island of Nui. Mendaña made contact with the islanders but was unable to land. During Mendaña's second voyage across the Pacific he passed Niulakita on 29 August 1595. Captain John Byron passed through the islands of Tuvalu in 1764 during his circumnavigation of the globe as captain of HMS Dolphin.

Keith S. Chambers and Doug Munro (1980) identify Niutao as the island that Francisco Mourelle de la Rúa sailed past on 5 May 1781, thus solving what Europeans had called The Mystery of Gran Cocal. Mourelle's map and journal named the island El Gran Cocal ('The Great Coconut Plantation'); however, the latitude and longitude was uncertain.  Longitude could only be reckoned crudely as accurate chronometers were available until the late 18th century. Visits to the islands became more frequent in the 19th century.

The islands came under Britain's sphere of influence in the late 19th century. The Ellice Islands were administered by Britain as a protectorate as part of the British Western Pacific Territories from 1892 to 1916 and as part of the Gilbert and Ellice Islands Colony from 1916 to 1974. In 1974 the Ellice Islanders voted for separate British dependency status for Tuvalu, separating from the Gilbert Islands which became Kiribati upon independence. Tuvalu became fully independent within The Commonwealth in 1978. On 17 September 2000 Tuvalu became the 189th member of the United Nations.

General reference 

 Pronunciation:
 Common English country name:  Tuvalu
 Official English country name:  Tuvalu
 Common endonym(s):  
 Official endonym(s):  
 Adjectival(s): Tuvaluan
 Demonym(s): Tuvaluan
 Etymology: From first settlement, eight of the nine islands of Tuvalu were inhabited; thus the name, Tuvalu, means "eight standing together" in Tuvaluan (compare to *walo meaning "eight" in Proto-Austronesian)..
 ISO country codes:  TV, TUV, 798
 ISO region codes:  See ISO 3166-2:TV
 Internet country code top-level domain:  .tv

Geography of Tuvalu 

Geography of Tuvalu: The islands of Tuvalu are spread out between the latitude of 5° to 10° south and longitude of 176° to 180°, west of the International Date Line.

Geographic coordinates:  to 

 Tuvalu is...
 a group of islands, comprising...
 three reef islands
 six true atolls
 a country
 an island country
 a nation state
 a Commonwealth realm
 Location:
 Southern Hemisphere and Eastern Hemisphere
 Pacific Ocean
 South Pacific Ocean
 Oceania
 Polynesia
 Time zone: Tuvalu Time (UTC+12)
 Extreme points of Tuvalu
 High:  unnamed location on Niulakita 
 Low:  South Pacific Ocean 0 m
 Land boundaries:  none
 Coastline:  South Pacific Ocean 24 km
 Population of Tuvalu: 10,837 (2012 Population & Housing Census Preliminary Analytical Report) - 229th most populous country

 Area of Tuvalu: 26 km2
 Atlas of Tuvalu

Environment of Tuvalu 

 Climate of Tuvalu
 Tuvalu Meteorological Service
 Geology of Tuvalu
 Protected areas of Tuvalu
 Funafuti Conservation Area
 Biosphere reserves in Tuvalu
 Fauna of Tuvalu
 Birds of Tuvalu
 Butterflies of Tuvalu
 Mammals of Tuvalu
 Flora of Tuvalu
 Native broadleaf forest

Natural geographic features of Tuvalu 

Tuvalu consists of three reef islands and six true atolls, whose highest point above the sea is five metres.

 Islands of Tuvalu
 Coral reefs of Tuvalu
 Lakes of Tuvalu: landlocked lagoons in Nanumaga and Niutao
 Rivers of Tuvalu: none
 World Heritage Sites in Tuvalu: none

Regions of Tuvalu 

Islands of Tuvalu
Local government districts consisting of more than one islet:
Funafuti
Nanumea
Nui
Nukufetau
Nukulaelae
Vaitupu
Local government districts consisting of only one island:
Nanumanga
Niulakita
Niutao

Ecoregions of Tuvalu 

Funafuti Conservation Area

Demography of Tuvalu 

Demographics of Tuvalu

Government and politics of Tuvalu 

Politics of Tuvalu
 Form of government: parliamentary monarchy (Commonwealth realm)
 Constitution of Tuvalu
 Capital of Tuvalu: Funafuti
 Elections in Tuvalu
 Political parties in Tuvalu: none

Branches of the government of Tuvalu 

Government of Tuvalu

Executive branch of the government of Tuvalu 
 Head of state: King of Tuvalu, Charles III, represented in Tuvalu by a Governor General appointed by the King upon the advice of the Prime Minister of Tuvalu
 Head of government: Prime Minister of Tuvalu
 Cabinet of Tuvalu

Legislative branch of the government of Tuvalu 
 Parliament of Tuvalu (unicameral)

Judicial branch of the government of Tuvalu 
 Judiciary
 High Court of Tuvalu
 Court of Appeal of Tuvalu

Foreign relations of Tuvalu 

Foreign relations of Tuvalu
 Diplomatic missions in Tuvalu
 Diplomatic missions of Tuvalu

International organization membership 
Tuvalu is a member of:

African, Caribbean, and Pacific Group of States (ACP)
Asian Development Bank (ADB)
Commonwealth of Nations
Food and Agriculture Organization (FAO)
International Federation of Red Cross and Red Crescent Societies (IFRCS) (observer)
International Maritime Organization (IMO)
International Olympic Committee (IOC)
International Telecommunication Union (ITU)
Organisation for the Prohibition of Chemical Weapons (OPCW)

Pacific Islands Forum (PIF)
Secretariat of the Pacific Community (SPC)
South Pacific Regional Trade and Economic Cooperation Agreement (Sparteca)
United Nations (UN)
United Nations Conference on Trade and Development (UNCTAD)
United Nations Educational, Scientific, and Cultural Organization (UNESCO)
Universal Postal Union (UPU)
World Health Organization (WHO)

Law and order in Tuvalu 

Law of Tuvalu
 Crime in Tuvalu
 Human Rights in Tuvalu
 LGBT rights in Tuvalu
 Religion in Tuvalu
 Law enforcement in Tuvalu

Military of Tuvalu 

Military of Tuvalu
There is no military in Tuvalu. Its national police force, the Tuvalu Police Force headquartered in Funafuti, includes a maritime surveillance unit, customs, prisons and immigration.

Local government in Tuvalu 
 Local government

History of Tuvalu 

History of Tuvalu
 Timeline of the history of Tuvalu
 Current events of Tuvalu

Culture of Tuvalu 

Culture of Tuvalu

 Architecture of Tuvalu
 Cuisine of Tuvalu
 Public holidays in Tuvalu
 Festivals in Tuvalu
 Tuvaluan language
 Tuvaluan mythology
 National symbols of Tuvalu
 Coat of arms of Tuvalu
 Flag of Tuvalu
 National anthem of Tuvalu
 People of Tuvalu
 Records of Tuvalu: Tuvalu National Library and Archives
 Religion in Tuvalu
 Christianity in Tuvalu: Church of Tuvalu
 Islam in Tuvalu
 World Heritage Sites in Tuvalu: None

Art in Tuvalu 
 Art of Tuvalu
 Music of Tuvalu

Sports in Tuvalu 
 Sports in Tuvalu
 Football in Tuvalu
 Tuvalu at the Olympics
 Tuvalu at the Pacific Games
 Tuvalu at the Commonwealth Games
 Tuvaluan records in athletics

Economy and infrastructure of Tuvalu 

Economy of Tuvalu
 Economic rank, by nominal GDP (2007): 190th (one hundred and ninetieth)
 Agriculture in Tuvalu
 Financial institutions in Tuvalu
 National Bank of Tuvalu
 Tuvalu Trust Fund
 Communications
 Tuvalu Telecommunications Corporation
 Tuvalu Media Corporation
 Public sector enterprises of Tuvalu
 Tuvalu Maritime Training Institute
 Tuvalu Philatelic Bureau
 Vaiaku Lagi Hotel
 Private sector enterprises of Tuvalu
Currency of Tuvalu: Tuvaluan dollar/Australian dollar
ISO 4217: TVD/AUD
 Energy in Tuvalu
 Renewable energy in Tuvalu
 Tourism in Tuvalu
 Visa policy of Tuvalu
 Transport in Tuvalu

Education in Tuvalu 

Education in Tuvalu
  History of education in Tuvalu
 Motufoua Secondary School
 Tuvalu Maritime Training Institute

Infrastructure of Tuvalu 

 Health care in Tuvalu
 Princess Margaret Hospital
 Transportation in Tuvalu
 Air travel
 Funafuti International Airport
 Shipping in Tuvalu
 Roads in Tuvalu
 Water supply and sanitation in Tuvalu

Filmography
Documentary films about Tuvalu:

	Tu Toko Tasi (Stand by Yourself) (2000) Conrad Mill, a Secretariat of the Pacific Community (SPC) production.
 Paradise Domain – Tuvalu (Director: Joost De Haas, Bullfrog Films/TVE 2001) 25:52 minutes - YouTube video.
 Tuvalu island tales (A Tale of two Islands) (Director: Michel Lippitsch) 34 minutes - YouTube video.
	The Disappearing of Tuvalu: Trouble in Paradise (2004) by Christopher Horner and Gilliane Le Gallic.
	Paradise Drowned: Tuvalu, the Disappearing Nation (2004) Written and produced by Wayne Tourell. Directed by Mike O'Connor, Savana Jones-Middleton and Wayne Tourell.
	Going Under (2004) by Franny Armstrong, Spanner Films.
	Before the Flood: Tuvalu (2005) by Paul Lindsay (Storyville/BBC Four).
	Time and Tide (2005) by Julie Bayer and Josh Salzman, Wavecrest Films 
	Tuvalu: That Sinking Feeling (2005) by Elizabeth Pollock from PBS Rough Cut
	Atlantis Approaching (2006) by Elizabeth Pollock, Blue Marble Productions 
	King Tide | The Sinking of Tuvalu (2007) by Juriaan Booij.
 Tuvalu (Director: Aaron Smith, ‘Hungry Beast’ program, ABC June 2011) 6:40 minutes - YouTube video
	Tuvalu: Renewable Energy in the Pacific Islands Series (2012) Global Environment Facility (GEF), United Nations Development Programme (UNDP) and Secretariat of the Pacific Regional Environment Programme (SPREP) 10 minutes – YouTube video.
 Mission Tuvalu (Missie Tuvalu) (2013) feature documentary directed by Jeroen van den Kroonenberg.
 ThuleTuvalu (2014) by Matthias von Gunten, HesseGreutert Film/OdysseyFilm.

Bibliography
Bibliography of Tuvalu

Further reading
 Lonely Planet Guide: South Pacific & Micronesia, by various.  
 Bennetts, Peter and Tony Wheeler, Time & Tide: The Islands of Tuvalu, Lonely Planet (2001)  
 Chalkley, John, Vaitupu – An Account of Life on a Remote Polynesian Atoll, Matuku Publications (1999) 
 Ells, Philip, Where the Hell is Tuvalu? Virgin Books (2008)  
 Watling, Dick, A Guide to the Birds of Fiji and Western Polynesia: Including American Samoa, Niue, Samoa, Tokelau, Tonga, Tuvalu and Wallis and Futuna, Environmental Consultants (Fiji) Ltd; 2nd edition (2003)  
 

 Customs and Traditions
 Brady, Ivan, Kinship Reciprocity in the Ellice Islands, Journal of the Polynesian Society 81:3 (1972), 290–316
 Brady, Ivan, Land Tenure in the Ellice Islands, in Henry P. Lundsaarde (ed). Land Tenure in Oceania, Honolulu, University Press of Hawaii (1974)  
 Chambers, Keith & Anne Chambers Unity of Heart: Culture and Change in a Polynesian Atoll Society (January 2001) Waveland Pr Inc.  
 Koch, Gerd, Die Materielle Kulture der Ellice-Inseln, Berlin: Museum fur Volkerkunde (1961); The English translation by Guy Slatter, was published as The Material Culture of Tuvalu, University of the South Pacific in Suva (1981) ASIN B0000EE805.

 History

 Tuvalu: A History (1983) Isala, Tito and Larcy, Hugh (eds.), Institute of Pacific Studies, University of the South Pacific and Government of Tuvalu
 Suamalie N.T. Iosefa, Doug Munro, Niko Besnier, Tala O Niuoku, Te: the German Plantation on Nukulaelae Atoll 1865–1890 (1991) Published by the Institute of Pacific Studies. 
 Pulekai A. Sogivalu, Brief History of Niutao, A, (1992) Published by the Institute of Pacific Studies. 
 Macdonald, Barrie, Cinderellas of the Empire: towards a history of Kiribati and Tuvalu, Institute of Pacific Studies, University of the South Pacific, Suva, Fiji, (2001).  (Australian National University Press, first published 1982)

 Language
 Vaiaso ote Gana, Tuvalu Language Week Education Resource 2016 (New Zealand Ministry for Pacific Peoples)
 Besnier, Niko, Literacy, Emotion and Authority: Reading and Writing on a Polynesian Atoll, Cambridge University Press (1995)  
 Besnier, Niko, Tuvaluan: A Polynesian Language of the Central Pacific. (Descriptive Grammars) (2000) Routledge  
 Jackson, Geoff W. & Jenny Jackson, Introduction to Tuvaluan, An (1999)  .
 Jackson, Geoff W., Te Tikisionale O Te Gana Tuvalu, A Tuvaluan-English Dictionary (1994) Suva, Fiji, Oceania Printers. ASIN: B0006F7FNY.
 Kennedy, Donald Gilbert, Te ngangana a te Tuvalu – Handbook on the language of the Ellice Islands (1946) Websdale, Shoosmith, Sydney N.S.W.

 Music and Dance
 Christensen, Dieter, Old Musical Styles in the Ellice Islands, Western Polynesia, Ethnomusicology, 8:1 (1964), 34–40
 Christensen, Dieter and Gerd Koch, Die Musik der Ellice-Inseln, Berlin: Museum fur Volkerkunde (1964)
 Koch, Gerd, Songs of Tuvalu (translated by Guy Slatter), Institute of Pacific Studies, University of the South Pacific (2000)

See also 

List of international rankings
Member state of the Commonwealth of Nations
Member state of the United Nations
Monarchy of Tuvalu
Outline of geography
Outline of Oceania

References

External links

 Te Kakeega III – National Strategy for Sustainable Development 2016-2020
 Te Kete - National Strategy for Sustainable Development 2021-2030

External links 

 Timeless Tuvalu - The Official Travel Website of Tuvalu
 
Small Is Beautiful A lobby group set up to help the island nation

Tuvalu
Outline